Saint Paul is an unincorporated community in Lewis County, Kentucky, United States.

References

Unincorporated communities in Lewis County, Kentucky
Unincorporated communities in Kentucky
Kentucky populated places on the Ohio River